is the seventh single released by Mr. Children on December 12, 1994.

Overview
 debuted at No. 1 single on the Oricon Japanese charts and managed to sell 1,240,040 copies during its run on the chart. The title track was not used in any promotional tie-ins and was originally intended to be the b-side of the "Tomorrow Never Knows" single. The song was also included in the Mr. Children live album 1/42, released on September 8, 1999. The b-side  was included in Mr. Children's compilation album, B-Side, released on May 10, 2007.

Track listing

Personnel 
 Kazutoshi Sakurai – vocals, guitar
 Kenichi Tahara – guitar
 Keisuke Nakagawa – bass
 Hideya Suzuki – drums
 Es sisters - chorus

Production 
 Producer – Kobayashi Takeshi
 Arrangement - Mr. Children and Takeshi Kobayashi
 Recorded by - Hiroshi Hiranuma, Kunihiko Imai
 Computer programming - Ken Matsumoto, Yoshinori Kadoya

References 

1994 singles
Oricon Weekly number-one singles
Mr. Children songs
Songs written by Kazutoshi Sakurai
1994 songs
Toy's Factory singles